Calcutta is an unincorporated community and census-designated place in southeastern Columbiana County, Ohio, United States. The population was 3,941 at the 2020 census. Historically a rural town, Calcutta grew as businesses from neighboring East Liverpool moved into larger shopping centers clustered around Ohio State Route 170.

History

The first permanent settlement in the area was in 1792 or 1793, by hunter John Quinn. Calcutta was laid out in 1810 as "West Union". It had also been called "Foulkstown", for William Foulks, who built the first brick house there, as well as "Nineveh", after the Biblical city of the same name. Finally, it was renamed "Calcutta", after the Indian city of Kolkata (formerly anglicised as Calcutta). A post office called Calcutta was established in 1838, and remained in operation until 1913.

Geography
Calcutta is located near the center of St. Clair Township at  (40.682271, -80.570204) in southeastern Columbiana County. The Calcutta CDP extends southwest as far as the U.S. Route 30 expressway, and east and north as far Little Beaver Creek, touching the Pennsylvania state line where the creek crosses the border briefly. The CDP is bordered by Longs Run, a tributary of Little Beaver Creek, on the northwest. To the southwest of Calcutta, across US 30, is the CDP of Glenmoor.

The following highways pass through Calcutta: 
   U.S. Route 30
   State Route 11
   State Route 170

Demographics

As of the census of 2000, there were 3,491 people, 1,417 households, and 1,025 families residing in the CDP. The population density was 297.1 people per square mile (114.7/km2). There were 1,473 housing units at an average density of 125.4/sq mi (48.4/km2). The racial makeup of the CDP was 98.51% White, 0.17% African American, 0.06% Native American, 0.72% Asian, 0.09% from other races, and 0.46% from two or more races. Hispanic or Latino of any race were 0.66% of the population.

There were 1,417 households, out of which 27.7% had children under the age of 18 living with them, 62.2% were married couples living together, 7.7% had a female householder with no husband present, and 27.6% were non-families. 25.2% of all households were made up of individuals, and 14.9% had someone living alone who was 65 years of age or older. The average household size was 2.38 and the average family size was 2.84.

In the CDP the population was spread out, with 20.6% under the age of 18, 5.7% from 18 to 24, 23.7% from 25 to 44, 27.4% from 45 to 64, and 22.6% who were 65 years of age or older. The median age was 45 years. For every 100 females there were 86.9 males. For every 100 females age 18 and over, there were 84.6 males.

The median income for a household in the CDP was $36,194, and the median income for a family was $45,750. Males had a median income of $41,077 versus $21,352 for females. The per capita income for the CDP was $19,536. About 3.0% of families and 8.3% of the population were below the poverty line, including 8.1% of those under age 18 and 9.7% of those age 65 or over.

Government
Since Calcutta is unincorporated, it does not have a government of its own. Governance is deflected to St. Clair Township, which also governs the community of Glenmoor, Ohio and the surrounding rural area. The township is governed by a three-member board of trustees, who are elected in November of odd-numbered years to a four-year term beginning on the following January 1. Two are elected in the year after the presidential election and one is elected in the year before it. There is also an elected township fiscal officer, who serves a four-year term beginning on April 1 of the year after the election, which is held in November of the year before the presidential election. Vacancies in the fiscal officership or on the board of trustees are filled by the remaining trustees.

Education
Children in Calcutta are served by the Beaver Local School District. The current schools serving Calcutta are:
 Beaver Local Elementary School – grades K-4
 Beaver Local Middle School – grades 5-8
 Beaver Local High School – grades 9-12

References

Census-designated places in Columbiana County, Ohio
1810 establishments in Ohio
Populated places established in 1810